The Voskhod mine is a large mine in the north-west of Kazakhstan. Voskhod represents one of the largest chromium reserve in Kazakhstan having estimated reserves of 27.1 million tonnes of ore grading 48.5% chromium.  The 27.1 million tonnes of ore contains 13.1 million tonnes of chromium metal.

See also 
Mineral industry of Kazakhstan

References 

Chromium mines in Kazakhstan